The Kumo Xi, also known as the Tatabi, were a Mongolic steppe people located in current Northeast China from 207 CE to 907 CE. After the death of their ancestor Tadun in 207, they were no longer called Wuhuan but joined the Khitan Xianbei in submitting to the Yuwen Xianbei. Their history is widely linked to the more famous Khitan.

During their history, the Kumo Xi engaged in conflict with numerous Chinese dynasties and with the Khitan tribes, eventually suffering a series of disastrous defeats to Chinese armies and coming under the domination of the Khitans. In 907, the Kumo Xi were completely assimilated into the Khitan-led Liao dynasty of China.

Etymology
Omeljan Pritsak reconstructs the ethnonym underlying Middle Chinese *kʰuoH-mɑk̚-ɦei as qu(o)mâġ-ġay. The first element qu(o)mâġ is from *quo "yellowish" plus denominal suffix *-mAk, cognate with Mongolian qumaġ "fine sands" and with Turkic qumaq and qum. As for *ɦei, Christopher Atwood (2010) proposed that it reflects an i-suffixed form of OC 胡 *gâ > hú. Further, gâ is etymologically uncertain: Peter Benjamin Golden (2003) proposes several Mongolic etymologies: ɣai "trouble, misfortune, misery", χai "interjection of grief", χai "to seek", χai "to hew", albeit none compelling.

Pritsak proposes that the qu(o)mâġ-ġay comprised two Proto-Mongolic groups: the Qu(o)mâġ, whom he linked to the Kimek and the Qun/Cumans (whose ethnonym possibly meant "yellow") and the Qay proper. However, Golden thinks that qu(o)mâġ-ġay simply means "desert Qay" or "sand Qay", referring to their earlier habitat.

As for the exonym Tatabï given to Kumo Xi by Göktürks, Yury Zuev (2002) compares Tatabï to Avestan tata apo and proposes an etymology from Iranic *tata-api "falling waters", after having noted that the name of a Xī-(奚)-associated tribe Bái-Xí 白霫 (< MC *bˠæk̚-ziɪp̚) literally meant "white downpour/torrent" in Chinese, and that the Xī (奚) and Xí (霫) occupied the same area, Zhongjing (中京).

Origin

The Kumo Xi were descendants of the Wuhuan. The Book of the Later Han records that “the language and culture of the Xianbei are the same as the Wuhuan”. Along with the Xianbei, the Wuhuan formed part of the proto-Mongolic Donghu confederation in the 4th century BC. The Weishu (Description of the Khitan, Vol. 1000, 2221) records that the Kumo Xi and Khitans (descendants of the Xianbei) spoke the same language.

The Book of Wei (Description of the Khitan, Vol. 100, 2223) records :

The Book of Sui records:

The New Book of Tang records:

History
In 388 AD, the Kumo Xi and Khitans fought with the Xianbei Northern Wei dynasty. The conflict severely weakened the Kumo Xi while the Khitans were not as badly affected, resulting in their split into separate polities. 

By the early Tang period (around the 7th century AD), the (now named) Xi had become subordinate to the Khitans. After the Khitans' Li-Sun Rebellion (696-697) and revolt of Ketuyu (730-734), the Xi regained their position of dominance. The Xi then entered a golden age, lasting from approximately 755 to 847. During this period the Xi were friendly with An Lushan, and supported An in his An Shi Rebellion (756-763), plundering Han territories frequently within this period. This aggressive policy seems to have consumed Xi forces, especially weakening their demographic vitality, allowing the less aggressive Khitans to dominate them. Xi raids into China provoked successive heavy responses from the Tang, resulting in battles in the 760s and in 795 that were disastrous for the Xi. After 795, the Xi became a tributary people to the Tang.

The Uyghur Empire (744-840) collapsed in the 840's. When the Tang dynasty simultaneously displayed signs of division, the Xi rose in rebellion in 847, and were subsequently and disastrously defeated by Zhang Zhongwu, the frontier commander of Lulong. The Xi were never able to recover from their defeat in 847. In the late ninth century AD the Khitans rose to eventually absorb the remnants of Xi people, and established the Liao Dynasty in 907.

Cultural heritage
It is believed that the Xiqin, a bowed, stringed instrument that is the ancestor of the Chinese Erhu, the Mongolian Khuuchir and Morin khuur, was derived from a Xi instrument.

See also
 Proto-Mongols

Notes

References
 Suhe Balu. "The Ancient Legend of the Morin Khuur: The Ancient Legend of Guo'er Luosi". Songyuan Culture. www.0438.cn May 12, 2009. Retrieved on July 4, 2011.
 

207 establishments
States and territories disestablished in 907
States and territories established in the 3rd century
Ethnic groups in Chinese history
Khitans
Mongol peoples
Wuhuan